Trailblazer is an independent British publisher of travel, trekking and railway route-guides. Started by author Bryn Thomas in 1991, it was originally synonymous with the Trans-Siberian Handbook, which for years was the only guide to crossing Asia by rail and remains much respected. Another early success was Mark Elliott and Wil Klass's Asia Overland (1998).

The company now publishes guides to long-distance footpaths in the United Kingdom, and hiking and adventure tourism guides to destinations elsewhere.

The publisher should not be confused with Trailblazer Travel Books, a series of recreational guides for the Hawaiian Islands, Sierra Nevada, and San Francisco, which are published by California-based Diamond Valley Company.

References

External links
 Official Trailblazer website

Travel guide books
Walking in the United Kingdom
Hiking
Book publishing companies of the United Kingdom